is a railway station in Itoshima, Fukuoka Prefecture, Japan. It is operated by JR Kyushu and is on the Chikuhi Line.

Lines
Only local services on the Chikuhi Line stop at this station.

Station layout
The station consists of an island platforms serving two tracks with a siding. The station building is a modern structure of steel and plate glass and is unstaffed, serving only as a waiting room. Access to the island platform is by means of a footbridge.

Adjacent stations

History
When the Kitakyushu Railway was nationalized on 1 October 1937, Japanese Government Railways (JGR) took over control of the station and designated the line which served it as the Chikuhi Line. With the privatization of Japanese National Railways (JNR), the successor of JGR, on 1 April 1987, control of the station passed to JR Kyushu.

In 2012, work began on a new station building to replace the old one which had been built in 1938. The old station building was demolished thereafter.

Passenger statistics
In fiscal 2012, there were a daily average of 78 passengers (boarding only) using the station.

Environs
National Route 202

See also
 List of railway stations in Japan

References

External links
Shikaka Station (JR Kyushu)

Railway stations in Japan opened in 1923
Chikuhi Line
Railway stations in Fukuoka Prefecture
Stations of Kyushu Railway Company